Malaria was a common affliction in populations that lived beside the River Thames until the middle of the Victorian era, not only in its estuary, but even in central London. It was frequently lethal. Some cases continued to occur until early in the 20th century. Why malaria died out in England is rather unclear.

Thames marshes

Malaria was commonplace in the Thames marshes, including London, and was called "ague" or "marsh fever".  While not all agues were caused by malaria, most scholars believe true malaria – the protozoan infection – was indeed present.  Descriptions in early 19th century medical textbooks leave little doubt, since:  It was mainly transmitted by the mosquito Anopheles atroparvus, and was frequently lethal.  It was so bad that most clergymen refused to reside in their parishes, where these were near the marshes.

Introduction of the disease to Britain
Possibly malaria was introduced by the Roman invaders; evidence from skeletons suggests the disease was present in Anglo-Saxon England.

Endemicity

It was anyway rife by the 16th century, though the climate (the "Little Ice Age") was colder than today. James I and Oliver Cromwell were thought to have died of it, and it was prevalent in London before and after the Great Fire.  Shakespeare mentions ague in eight of his plays as if his London audiences would be familiar with aspects of the disease.  

Mary Dobson said that 
Writing around 1800, Edward Hasted notedThe heavy use of opium (often consumed as poppy-head tea) and alcohol to fight the fever was commonplace.  Later, the disease was combated with quinine; that this treatment was effective tends to confirm it was malaria, and not some unrelated malady.

London
At Guy's Hospital they frequently received ague cases from the Thames marshes, William Gull told the House of Commons in 1854.  About a half came from Woolwich and Erith, but cases also came from Wapping and Shadwell, and along the river from Bermondsey and Lambeth and even Westminster.  (At that time it was believed the disease came from breathing bad air – mal-aria – arising from marshes.  Gull recommended the marshes should be drained.)

Decline and disappearance

Generally, deaths started to decline after 1800, although there was a fairly sharp peak around 1860.  Some cases occurred in all parts of England (and even in Scotland), but by far the worst area was in the Thames (and the fens of Cambridgeshire).

By the end of the Victorian era indigenous malaria had nearly disappeared from England, but a few cases survived into the 20th century enabling the disease to be positively identified by blood tests. It was probably caused by the protozoan parasite Plasmodium vivax.

While the draining of the Thames marshes did not, by itself, eradicate malaria – in places the mosquito still abounds  – it may have been a contributory cause.  Why it did disappear is complex and uncertain. The mosquito prefers to take blood from livestock, so increasing livestock densities (brought about by the introduction of root crops as winter fodder) may have diverted biting from humans to domestic animals. Other factors may have included better housing, health care, sanitation and hygiene (by helping to reduce transmission rates), smaller rural populations as manual labor was replaced by machinery, and better insulation of houses in winter.

Global warming and British malaria
In 2002 the Chief Medical Officer predicted that by 2050 the British climate might so warm that indigenous malaria would be re-established. However, a paper by Kuhn et al in Proceedings of the National Academy of Sciences, examining historical data, disagreed. Temperature and rainfall were just two factors tending to increase transmissibility of malaria, but wetland acreage and cattle population were more important. The projected climate change, by itself, was "clearly insufficient".

Notes and references

Sources
 

 

 

 

 

History of London
History of the River Thames
Land reclamation
Malaria